Freddy and the Millionaire is a 1961 Italian-West German musical film directed by Paul May and starring Freddy Quinn, Heinz Erhardt and Grit Boettcher.

It was shot at the Baldham Studios in Bavaria and on location in Ischia. The film's sets were designed by the art directors Werner Achmann and Rolf Zehetbauer.

Cast
 Freddy Quinn as Fritz Meyer
 Heinz Erhardt as Präsident John Stone, Millionär
 Grit Boettcher as Edith Schmidt
 Vittoria Prada as Silvia Stone
 Hubert von Meyerinck as Direktor Walloschek
 Peter Vogel as Kunststudent
 Claus Wilcke as Rex
 Joseph Offenbach as Robert, Diener
 Enrico Viarisio as Arzt
 Giustino Durano as Polizist
 Cathrin Heyer as June
 Henry van Lyck as Jellicot, Sekretär
 Gerd Potyka
 Paul Bös
 Harry Hertzsch
 Paul Bürks as van Straaten
 Grethe Weiser as Mrs. Keller
 Betty Curtis
 Ursula Herwig as Silvia Stone (voice)
 Ulla Nielsen as Herself - Singer
 Ulla Richter
 Klaus Schwarzkopf as Polizist (voice)

Bibliography

External links 
 

1961 films
West German films
German musical comedy films
Italian musical comedy films
1961 musical comedy films
1960s German-language films
Films directed by Paul May
Gloria Film films
1960s German films
1960s Italian films